Phúc Sơn may refer to several places in Vietnam, including:

, a rural commune of Nghĩa Lộ.
Phúc Sơn, Sơn Động, a rural commune of Sơn Động District, Bắc Giang Province.
Phúc Sơn, Tân Yên, a rural commune of Tân Yên District, Bắc Giang Province.
, a rural commune of Anh Sơn District.
, a rural commune of Chiêm Hóa District.